Revolution My A is a 1970 Danish film directed by Erik Balling and starring Ove Sprogøe.

Cast

 Ove Sprogøe - Arthur Antonsen
 Poul Bundgaard - Præsident Jesus Maria Salvadore
 Helle Virkner - Frk. Nyborg
 Helle Hertz - Eva
 Poul Reichhardt - Efterretningschef
 Gotha Andersen - Portier Kubolsky
 Carl Duering - Major Bodenschatz
 Else-Marie - Fru Johansen
 Ejner Federspiel - Taxachauffør
 Poul Glargaard - Galan
 Paul Hagen - Grønthandler
 Caja Heimann
 Lise Henningsen - Bartender
 Knud Hilding - Overbetjent
 Valsø Holm - Hoteldirektør Ludvigsen
 Svend Erik Jensen - Guteraguaner
 Preben Kaas - Gonzales
 Hans Kristensen - Mand, hvis bil bliver ødelagt
 Jesper Langberg - Værnepligtig
 Thorkil Lauritzen - Arrestforvarer Hansen
 Gunnar Lemvigh - Kriminalassistent
 Ernst Meyer - Pakkebudet
 Ole Monty - Overbetjent i arrest
 Kate Mundt
 Georg Nielsen - Guteraguaner
 Kjeld Noack - Guteraguaner
 Bjørn Puggaard-Müller - Diplomat
 André Sallyman - Guteraguaner
 Kirsten Sloth
 Peter Steen - Diplomat
 Gunnar Strømvad - Guteraguaner
 Elga Olga Svendsen
 Poul Thomsen - Luftmarskal

References

External links

1970 films
Danish comedy films
1970s Danish-language films
Films directed by Erik Balling
Films with screenplays by Erik Balling